Tax in kind or tax-in-kind usually refers to any taxation that is paid in kind, that is with goods or services rather than money, including: 

 fisc, in the Frankish kingdoms of the Medieval period 
 food render, a feorm or tax-in-kind provided through royal vills in Anglo-Saxon England
 kharaj, instituted during the period of the Islamic Empire 
 a tax on agricultural produce imposed by the Confederate States of America in 1863
 Prodnalog, paid by private farms in Bolshevik Russia during the 1920s
 An agricultural tax in North Korea imposed in 1947 and abolished in 1966

See also
Barter

References

History of taxation